The Nizhnedonskoy constituency (No.150) is a Russian legislative constituency in Rostov Oblast. The constituency was created in 2015 from most of former Rostov constituency and Azov Sea coast taken from Taganrog constituency.

Members elected

Election results

2016

|-
! colspan=2 style="background-color:#E9E9E9;text-align:left;vertical-align:top;" |Candidate
! style="background-color:#E9E9E9;text-align:leftt;vertical-align:top;" |Party
! style="background-color:#E9E9E9;text-align:right;" |Votes
! style="background-color:#E9E9E9;text-align:right;" |%
|-
| style="background-color:"|
|align=left|Mikhail Yemelyanov
|align=left|A Just Russia
|
|57.43%
|-
|style="background-color:"|
|align=left|Yevgeny Bessonov
|align=left|Communist Party
|
|17.11%
|-
|style="background-color:"|
|align=left|Igor Teperechkin
|align=left|Liberal Democratic Party
|
|9.84%
|-
|style="background-color: " |
|align=left|Andrey Sklyarov
|align=left|Yabloko
|
|2.82%
|-
|style="background-color:"|
|align=left|Aleksey Pelipenko
|align=left|Communists of Russia
|
|2.82%
|-
|style="background-color:"|
|align=left|Dmitry Velichko
|align=left|Party of Growth
|
|2.80%
|-
|style="background-color:"|
|align=left|Aleksey Dudarev
|align=left|Rodina
|
|2.76%
|-
|style="background-color:"|
|align=left|Yury Kolobrodov
|align=left|Patriots of Russia
|
|1.90%
|-
| colspan="5" style="background-color:#E9E9E9;"|
|- style="font-weight:bold"
| colspan="3" style="text-align:left;" | Total
| 
| 100%
|-
| colspan="5" style="background-color:#E9E9E9;"|
|- style="font-weight:bold"
| colspan="4" |Source:
|
|}

2021

|-
! colspan=2 style="background-color:#E9E9E9;text-align:left;vertical-align:top;" |Candidate
! style="background-color:#E9E9E9;text-align:left;vertical-align:top;" |Party
! style="background-color:#E9E9E9;text-align:right;" |Votes
! style="background-color:#E9E9E9;text-align:right;" |%
|-
| style="background-color:"|
|align=left|Anton Getta
|align=left|United Russia
|
|35.36%
|-
|style="background-color:"|
|align=left|Mikhail Yemelyanov (incumbent)
|align=left|A Just Russia — For Truth
|
|19.39%
|-
|style="background-color:"|
|align=left|Stanislav Potakov
|align=left|Communist Party
|
|15.91%
|-
|style="background-color:"|
|align=left|Yevgeny Fedyayev
|align=left|Liberal Democratic Party
|
|8.40%
|-
|style="background-color:"|
|align=left|Vladislav Madykin
|align=left|New People
|
|5.01%
|-
|style="background-color: "|
|align=left|Nadezhda Korteleva
|align=left|Party of Pensioners
|
|4.75%
|-
|style="background-color:"|
|align=left|Yevgeny Pykhonin
|align=left|Communists of Russia
|
|2.58%
|-
|style="background-color:"|
|align=left|Dmitry Velichko
|align=left|Party of Growth
|
|2.48%
|-
|style="background-color: " |
|align=left|Aleksandr Ryabchuk
|align=left|Yabloko
|
|1.78%
|-
|style="background-color:"|
|align=left|Andrey Tyurin
|align=left|Rodina
|
|1.76%
|-
| colspan="5" style="background-color:#E9E9E9;"|
|- style="font-weight:bold"
| colspan="3" style="text-align:left;" | Total
| 
| 100%
|-
| colspan="5" style="background-color:#E9E9E9;"|
|- style="font-weight:bold"
| colspan="4" |Source:
|
|}

References

Russian legislative constituencies
Politics of Rostov Oblast